Copley Hospital is a former hospital at 301 Weston Avenue in Aurora, Illinois. Opened in 1888, the hospital was the first in Aurora, and it remained the only hospital in Aurora until 1900. The building underwent several additions and expansions over time, both to add more space and to help modernize the hospital's practices. The first of these additions came in 1916, when a new wing opened; this section brought wider hallways, elevators, patient call systems, and better-lit patient rooms to the hospital. A 1932 addition was designed by architects Schmidt, Garden & Erikson in the Neoclassical style; it included an expansion for the hospital's maternity ward and radiology and training facilities. The same architects designed another addition in 1947, which coincided with the hospital's renaming in honor of Ira C. Copley; Copley's donations had funded both the 1932 and 1947 additions. Two more additions were placed on the building in 1970 and 1980, and the hospital was closed and replaced by the new Rush–Copley Medical Center in 1995. when the building was vacant it became popular with urban exploring and paranormal investigators as it is supposed to be haunted despite the building being unsafe. 

The hospital was added to the National Register of Historic Places on April 18, 2019. The hospital is now being renovated by Fox Valley Developers LLC and Kluber Architects + Engineers and will become a nursing home and an apartment for people who are disabled.

References

National Register of Historic Places in Kane County, Illinois
Hospital buildings on the National Register of Historic Places in Illinois
Hospital buildings completed in 1888
Defunct hospitals in Illinois
Buildings and structures in Aurora, Illinois